Cora davicrinita is a species of basidiolichen in the family Hygrophoraceae. It was formally described as a new species in 2016 by Bibiana Moncada, Santiago Madriñán, and Robert Lücking. The specific epithet davicrinita combines the first name of mycologist David Leslie Hawksworth with the Latin word crinitis ("fluffy"). The lichen occurs at elevations above  in the northern Andes of Colombia and Ecuador, where it grows in wet páramo as an epiphyte on shrub twigs. It is closely related to a complex of species around Cora minor.

References

davicrinita
Lichen species
Lichens described in 2016
Lichens of Central America
Taxa named by Robert Lücking
Basidiolichens